The Bermuda flicker (Colaptes oceanicus) is an extinct woodpecker from the genus Colaptes. It was confined to Bermuda and is known only by fossil remains dated to the Late Pleistocene and the Holocene. However, an old travel report by explorer Captain John Smith from the 17th century may also refer to this species.

Extinction
Though most material is from Late Pleistocene deposits unearthed by Storrs L. Olson, David B. Wingate and others in the Admirals Cave, the Wilkinson Quarry and in the Walsingham Sink Cave in Hamilton Parish in Bermuda in 1981, there is one bone, a tarsometatarsus from a juvenile, which is from a Holocene layer in the Spittal Pond. This fact, and an old travel report by John Smith from 1623, may lead to the possibility that this species just may have persisted until at least the early colonization of Bermuda. Smith wrote:

References

Bermuda flicker
Birds of Bermuda
Extinct animals of North America
Bird extinctions since 1500
Fossil taxa described in 2013
Extinct birds of Atlantic islands
Bermuda flicker
Late Quaternary prehistoric birds